Henry de Keighley (fl. 1297–1301) was an English politician.

He was a Member (MP) of the Parliament of England for Lancashire in 1297, 1298 and 1301.

References

13th-century births
14th-century deaths
English MPs 1298
English MPs 1297
English MPs 1301
Members of the Parliament of England (pre-1707) for Lancashire